Juan Pablo Goicochea del Carpio (born 12 January 2005) is a Peruvian footballer who plays as a forward for Alianza Lima.

Club career
Born in Lima, Goicochea started his career with Esther Grande, staying until the club folded in 2018, before joining Alianza Lima. His debut for Alianza was reportedly delayed due to interest from Brazilian clubs Grêmio and Botafogo. He began training with the Alianza first team in October 2022, and made his debut just a week later.

International career
Goicochea has represented Peru at under-20 level. On his eighteenth birthday, while representing Peru in a friendly against Bolivia, he and teammate Kenji Cabrera, as well as two Bolivian players, were sent off following a brawl. He was left with a black eye following a punch from a Bolivian player during the brawl.

Style of play
Known for his physical size, speed of positioning and goal-scoring ability, Goicochea has been labelled as the "new Paolo Guerrero" by press in Peru. He lists Claudio Pizarro, Gabriel Jesus and Jefferson Farfán as players he looks up to and styles his game on.

Career statistics

Club

Notes

References

2005 births
Living people
Footballers from Lima
Peruvian footballers
Association football forwards
Peruvian Primera División players
Esther Grande footballers
Club Alianza Lima footballers